Charles Price (December 4, 1888 – October 23, 1957) was a Canadian politician. He served in the Legislative Assembly of New Brunswick as member of the Progressive Conservative party from 1939 to 1944.

References

1888 births
1957 deaths
20th-century Canadian politicians
Progressive Conservative Party of New Brunswick MLAs
People from York County, New Brunswick